John Blain (born February 1, 1955) is a former professional Canadian football player with the Canadian Football League's the BC Lions. He attended Carson Graham Secondary School, where he joined the rugby and football team. After playing college football at San Jose State University, Blain spent his entire 11-year CFL career as an offensive lineman. He was named CFL All-Star in 1983, 1984 and 1985, and was a part of the Lions Grey Cup victory in 1985.

He was the Principal at Ladysmith Secondary School on Vancouver Island until the spring of 2009. Soon after, his occupation consisted of being a Principal at Dover Bay Secondary School on Vancouver Island until the summer of 2012.

References 

1955 births
Living people
San Jose State Spartans football players
Players of Canadian football from British Columbia
Canadian football offensive linemen
BC Lions players
Sportspeople from North Vancouver